Nakwi is a Left May language of Papua New Guinea, in East Sepik Province. It is close to Nimo.

Nakwi is spoken to the south of the Ama-speaking area, in Augot, Nakwi-Amasu, Tiki, and Uwau villages in Tunap/Hunstein Rural LLG, East Sepik Province.

References

Left May languages
Languages of East Sepik Province